Red King may refer to:

 The red King playing card
 Red King (Ultra monster), a foe of the Japanese superhero Ultraman
 Red King (comics), a number of comics characters of the same name
 William II of England, commonly known as William "Rufus", or "The Red King"
 Rory "Red King" MacDonald, a Canadian MMA fighter
 The Red King (novel), a children's book by author Victor Kelleher
 Red King (Through the Looking-Glass), a character in the Lewis Carroll novel Through the Looking-Glass
 An ancient king whose descendants are the main characters in Children of the Red King series of books by Jenny Nimmo
 Another name for the Crimson King from the works of Stephen King